Thomas Aaron Hunt is an Australian-born former English cricketer who is the grandson of John Hunt, Baron Hunt.  He made four first-class appearances during a career that saw him appear for Middlesex and Somerset County Cricket Clubs. The highlight of this was playing in the victorious Middlesex side that beat the touring Australian test team at Lords in 2001, Middlesex being the only side that tour to beat Australia. In 2004, batting at number 11 with John Francis, his four runs helped set a new record tenth wicket partnership for Somerset in Twenty20 cricket.

His career was held back by a consistent cartilage knee injury which forced his to retire at 22. He followed a distinguished junior career playing for England U-14/15/16 prior to injury set backs.

References

External links

1982 births
English cricketers
Somerset cricketers
Living people
Middlesex cricketers
Middlesex Cricket Board cricketers